The 2020–21 season was Maccabi Tel Aviv's 114th season since its establishment in 1906 and 73rd since the establishment of the State of Israel. During the 2020–21 campaign, the club competed in the Israeli Premier League, State Cup, Toto Cup, UEFA Champions League and UEFA Europa League.

Squad
As of August 5, 2020

Competitions

Israeli Premier League

League table

Results summary

Results by matchday

Matches

State Cup

Toto Cup

Israeli Super Cup

UEFA Champions League

Europa League

Group stage

The group stage draw was held on 2 October 2020.

Knockout phase

The round of 32 draw was held on 14 December 2020.

References

Maccabi Tel Aviv F.C. seasons
Maccabi Tel Aviv